Kurt Schneider (3 February 1900 – 26 July 1988) was a German long-distance runner. He competed in the marathon at the 1928 Summer Olympics.

References

1900 births
1988 deaths
Athletes (track and field) at the 1928 Summer Olympics
German male long-distance runners
German male marathon runners
Olympic athletes of Germany
People from Jelenia Góra
20th-century German people